The First Anastasiades government was the government of Cyprus, forming the Council of Ministers, in 2013–2018. Sworn in on 28 February 2013, it initially consisted of 13 ministers representing a governing coalition of President Nicos Anastasiades' Democratic Rally party (DISY) with DIKO and EVROKO parties. After the withdrawal of DIKO from the coalition in 2014, the government coalition consists only of DISY and EVROKO members, as well as other, independent technocrats. Following Anastasiades' victory in the 2018 election, the Second Anastasiades government was formed, with a very similar composition.

Council of Ministers

References

Government of Cyprus
Anastasiades 1
2013 establishments in Cyprus
Cabinets established in 2013
2010s in Cypriot politics